Alan Cameron may refer to:

 Sir Alan Cameron of Erracht (1753–1828), British army general
 Alan Cameron (classical scholar) (1938–2017), British classicist
 Alan Cameron (legal scholar), New Zealand legal scholar
 Alan Cameron (rugby union) (1929–2010), Australian rugby union footballer
 Pat Cameron (Alan John Patrick Cameron, 1895–1982), Canadian Member of Parliament
 Al Cameron (Alan Richard Cameron, born 1955), ice hockey player

See also
Allan Cameron (disambiguation)